Kannadakkaagi Ondannu Otti (English: Dial One for Kannada) is a 2018 Kannada film directed by Kushal Gowda  starring Shatamarshan Avinash and Krishi Thapanda. The cast includes Chikkanna, Dattanna, Rangayana Raghu, Suchendra Prasad.

Cast
 Krishi Thapanda
 Shatamarshan Avinash
 Chikkanna
 Dattanna
 Rangayana Raghu
 Suchendra Prasad
 Shruti Badami

Plot
Avinash is a young journalist who meets his friend after many years. They set out on a journey, during which Avinash opens up about his love story. However, their lives take a different turn soon after.

Soundtrack 
All the songs composed by Arjun Janya. The song "Nana mele nanageega" became a hit.

References

External links 
 

2018 films
2010s Kannada-language films